George Folsom (May 23, 1802 – March 27, 1869) was an American lawyer, historian, librarian, diplomat and senator from New York.

Early life
Folsom was born on May 23, 1802, in Kennebunk, York County, District of Maine. He was the son of Thomas Folsom (1769–1844), a jeweler and tavern-keeper, and Edna (née Ela) Folsom (1775–1851). The family moved to Portland, Maine in 1809.

George was educated at Phillips Exeter Academy in Exeter, New Hampshire and graduated from Harvard College in 1822. Then he studied law with U.S. Attorney Ether Shepley in Saco, Maine, was admitted to the bar, and practiced in Worcester, Massachusetts.

Career
While studying law he prepared the History of Saco and Biddeford (on-line copy; 331 pages) which was published in 1830. In 1831 he was elected a member of the American Antiquarian Society, and was a member of its publishing committee from 1834 to 1837.

About 1837, he removed to New York City, and practiced law there. He also became a member of the New York Historical Society, and was chosen the society's librarian, and one of the secretaries.  In 1843, he translated and published The Despatches of Hernando Cortes (on-line copy; 431 pages).

He was an American Republican member of the New York State Senate (1st D.) from 1845 to 1847, sitting in the 68th, 69th and 70th New York State Legislatures. At the 1846 New York state election, he ran on the American ticket for Lieutenant Governor of New York. He was U.S. Chargé d'affaires to the Netherlands from 1850 to 1853.

In 1860, he received the honorary degree of Doctor of law from the University of Vermont.

Personal life
In 1839, Folsom was married to Margaret Cornelia Winthrop (1801–1863), a daughter of Benjamin Winthrop and Judith (née Stuyvesant) Winthrop of New York City. Margaret was a descendant of Peter Stuyvesant, the last Dutch Director-General of New Netherland, and John Winthrop, the 3rd Governor the Massachusetts Bay Colony.  Together, they were the parents of three children:

 Margaret Winthrop Folsom (1842–1925), who was committed to an insane asylum when she was twenty-seven.
 Helen Stuyvestant Folsom (1843–1882), who became Sister Helen Margaret, CSJB.
 George Winthrop Folsom (1846–1915), who married Frances Elizabeth Fuller.

Folsom died on March 27, 1869, in Rome, Italy.  He was buried at St. Mark's Church in-the-Bowery.

References

External links 
 The George Folsom Papers at the New-York Historical Society

1802 births
1869 deaths
People from Kennebunk, Maine
Lawyers from New York City
Massachusetts lawyers
New York (state) lawyers
New York (state) state senators
New York (state) Know Nothings
19th-century American politicians
American antiquarians
Harvard College alumni
Ambassadors of the United States to the Netherlands
American librarians
19th-century American historians
19th-century American male writers
19th-century American diplomats
Burials in New York (state)
Members of the American Antiquarian Society
Politicians from New York City
Historians from New York (state)
Scientists from New York (state)
19th-century American lawyers
American male non-fiction writers